The following is a list of awards and nominations received by American film, television and theater producer Scott Rudin. Among his numerous accolades as a film and theatrical producer, Rudin has won eighteen Tony Awards, an Academy Award, an Emmy, a Grammy, four Golden Globes and sixteen Drama Desk Awards. Additionally, he has been nominated for ten BAFTA Awards. With his Grammy win for The Book of Mormon in 2012, he became one of the few people who have won an Emmy, Grammy, Oscar and Tony Award, and the first producer to do so.

Film and television

Academy Awards

British Academy Film Awards

Emmy Awards

Golden Globe Awards

Golden Raspberry Awards

Gotham Awards

Independent Spirit Awards

Producers Guild of America Awards

Other awards

Theatre

Tony Awards

Drama Desk Awards

Drama League Awards

Lucille Lortel Awards

Outer Critics Circle Awards

Music

Grammy Awards

References

Lists of awards received by person